Trenk is a surname. Notable people with this name include:

Ann Trenk, American mathematician
Franjo Trenk (1711–1749), Austrian soldier and nobleman
Hans Trenk, German commander of World War I submarine 
Henric Trenk (1818–1892), Swiss-born Romanian artist
Lieut. Trenk (died 1913), German airship officer, victim of the Johannisthal air disaster
Willy Trenk-Trebitsch (1902–1983), Austrian actor